Rosmarinic acid, named after rosemary (Salvia rosmarinus Linn.), is a polyphenol constituent of many  culinary herbs, including rosemary (Salvia rosmarinus L.), perilla (Perilla frutescens L.), sage (Salvia officinalis L.), mint (Mentha arvense L.), and basil (Ocimum basilicum L.).

History 
Rosmarinic acid was first isolated and characterized in 1958 by the Italian chemists Scarpatti and Oriente from rosemary (Salvia rosmarinus), after which the acid is named.

Chemistry 
Chemically, rosmarinic acid is a caffeic acid ester, with tyrosine providing another phenolic ring via dihydroxyphenyl-lactic acid. It has a molecular mass of 360 daltons.

Natural occurrences 
Rosmarinic acid accumulation is shown in hornworts, in the fern family Blechnaceae, and in species of several orders of mono- and dicotyledonous angiosperms.

It is found most notably in many Lamiaceae (dicotyledons in the order Lamiales), especially in the subfamily Nepetoideae. It is found in species used commonly as culinary herbs such as Ocimum basilicum (basil), Ocimum tenuiflorum (holy basil), Melissa officinalis (lemon balm), Salvia rosmarinus (rosemary), Origanum majorana (marjoram), Salvia officinalis (sage), thyme and peppermint. It is also found in plants in the family Marantaceae (monocotyledons in the order Zingiberales) such as species in the genera Maranta (Maranta leuconeura, Maranta depressa) and Thalia (Thalia geniculata).

Rosmarinic acid and the derivative rosmarinic acid 3′-O-β-D-glucoside can be found in Anthoceros agrestis, a hornwort (Anthocerotophyta).

Metabolism 
The biosynthesis of rosmarinic acid uses 4-coumaroyl-CoA from the general phenylpropanoid pathway as a hydroxycinnamoyl donor. The hydroxycinnamoyl acceptor substrate comes from the shikimate pathway: shikimic acid, quinic acid and 3,4-dihydroxyphenyllactic acid derived from L-tyrosine. Thus, chemically, rosmarinic acid is an ester of caffeic acid with 3,4-dihydroxyphenyllactic acid, but biologically, it is formed from 4-coumaroyl-4′-hydroxyphenyllactate. Rosmarinate synthase is an enzyme that uses caffeoyl-CoA and 3,4-dihydroxyphenyllactic acid to produce CoA and rosmarinate. Hydroxyphenylpyruvate reductase is also an enzyme involved in this biosynthesis.

Uses
When extracted from plant sources or synthesized in manufacturing, rosmarinic acid may be used in foods or beverages as a flavoring, in cosmetics, or as a dietary supplement.

References 

Acetylcholinesterase inhibitors
GABA transaminase inhibitors
Hydroxycinnamic acid esters
Nonsteroidal anti-inflammatory drugs
Phenol antioxidants
Vinylogous carboxylic acids
Catechols